J. R. R. Tolkien's The Fall of Gondolin is one of the stories which formed the basis for a section in his posthumously-published work, The Silmarillion, with a version later appearing in The Book of Lost Tales. In the narrative, Gondolin was founded by King Turgon in the First Age; the city was carefully hidden, enduring for centuries before being betrayed and destroyed. 

A stand-alone, book-length version of the story edited by Christopher Tolkien was published in 2018. The Fall of Gondolin is one of three stories from the First Age of Middle-earth that was published as a stand-alone book: the other two are Beren and Lúthien and The Children of Húrin.

Text

Origins 

Tolkien began writing the story that would become The Fall of Gondolin in 1917 in an army barracks on the back of a sheet of military marching music. It is the first traceable story of his Middle-earth legendarium that he wrote down on paper. While the first half of the story "appears to echo Tolkien's creative development and slow acceptance of duty in the first year of the war," the second half echoes his personal experience of battle. The story was read aloud by Tolkien to the Exeter College Essay Club in the spring of 1920.

Tolkien was constantly revising his First Age stories; however, the narrative he wrote in 1917, published posthumously in The Book of Lost Tales, remains the only full account of the fall of the city.

Publication of versions of the story 

The narrative "Of Tuor and the Fall of Gondolin" in the 1977 book The Silmarillion was the result of the editing by his son Christopher using the 1917 narrative (minus some elements all too obviously evocative of World War I warfare) and compressed versions from the different versions of the Annals and Quentas as various sources. The later Quenta Silmarillion and the Grey Annals, the main sources for much of the published Silmarillion, both stop before the beginning of the Tuor story.

A partial later version of The Fall of Gondolin was published in the 1980 book Unfinished Tales under the title "Of Tuor and his Coming to Gondolin". Originally titled "Of Tuor and the Fall of Gondolin," this narrative shows a great expansion of the earlier tale. Christopher Tolkien retitled the story before including it in Unfinished Tales, because it ends at the point of Tuor's arrival in Gondolin, and does not depict the actual Fall.

There is also an unfinished poem, The Lay of the Fall of Gondolin, of which a few verses are quoted in the 1985 book The Lays of Beleriand. In 130 verses Tolkien reaches the point where dragons attack the city.

Book

Publication history 

In 2018, the first stand-alone version of the story was published by HarperCollins in the UK and Houghton Mifflin in the US.  This version, illustrated by Alan Lee, has been curated and edited by Christopher Tolkien, J. R. R. Tolkien's son, who also edited The Silmarillion, Unfinished Tales, and the twelve-volume The History of Middle-earth which included The Book of Lost Tales.

Contents 

 Prologue 
 The Original Tale 
 The Earliest Text 
 "Turlin and the Exiles of Gondolin"
 The Story Told in the Sketch of the Mythology
 The Story Told in the Quenta Noldorinwa
 The Last Version
 The Evolution of the Story
 Conclusion

The book ends with a list of names, additional notes, and a glossary.

Reception

By Tolkien scholars 

Douglas Kane writes in Journal of Tolkien Research that The Fall of Gondolin was the first of Tolkien's three "Great Tales" to be written, and the last to be published, the other two being the Great Tale of Túrin Turumbar (published in The Children of Húrin, 2007, edited into a continuous story) and Beren and Lúthien (2017, presented as a set of versions of the story). That left the tale which was "arguably the one in which
the world of Middle-earth is most vividly presented and in which Tolkien’s philosophical themes are most profoundly expressed." Kane adds that although the book collects material already published, "it still succeeds in rounding out that task", for instance by putting the "Sketch of the Mythology" in the prologue. He wonders, though, why the editor included part of the poem "The Flight of the Noldoli from Valinor" (already in The Lays of Beleriand), but omits the poem fragment "The Lay of the Fall of Gondolin" which is far more obviously relevant. Kane admires Alan Lee's illustrations, both in colour and in black and white, as providing "a perfect complement" to the final book in the "unique and remarkable" collaboration between Christopher Tolkien and his father.

Jennifer Rogers, reviewing the book for Tolkien Studies, writes that it "highlights the power of the Gondolin story in its own right with minimal editorial intrusion." As Tolkien's first tale and the last one to be published by his son, the book is "laden with the sense of weight such a publication brings", taking the reader back to the place where the whole Legendarium began, the story about Eärendel (later called Eärendil).

In newspapers 

According to Entertainment Weekly, "Patient and dedicated readers will find among the references to other books and their many footnotes and appendices a poignant sense of completion and finality to the life's pursuit of a father and son." Writing for The Washington Post, writer Andrew Ervin said that "'The Fall of Gondolin' provides everything Tolkien's readers expect." According to The Independent, "Even amid the complexities and difficulties of the book—and there are many—there is enough splendid imagery and characterful prose that readers will be carried along to the end even if they don't know where they are going."

In science

The Finnish entomologist Lauri Kaila  named multiple species of moth in the genus Elachista, such as E. finarfinella, E. gildorella, and E. turgonella, after characters from The Fall of Gondolin.

See also
 Middle-earth canon

References

Sources 

 

Books published posthumously
Middle-earth books
2018 fantasy novels
English fantasy novels
HarperCollins books